The Cabaçal River (Portuguese, Rio Cabaçal) is a river of Mato Grosso state in western Brazil. It is a tributary of the Paraguay River.

Bororo of Cabaçal, an indigenous language that is now extinct, was formerly spoken around the river.

See also
List of rivers of Mato Grosso

References

Rivers of Mato Grosso